Mount Savage may refer to:
Mount Savage, Kentucky
Mount Savage, Maryland
Mount Savage Locomotive Works
Mount Savage Iron Works
Mount Savage Railroad
Mount Savage Castle
Mount Savage Historic District

See also
Savage Mountain